Peggy Andrée Yolande Roche (born 1 February 1929 Paris - 7 September 1991) was a French model, stylist and fashion editor. She is also known as the partner of Françoise Sagan, after having been the wife of Claude Brasseur.

Life 

She started modeling at Elle magazine in the late 1950s as a model, then was hired by Hélène Lazareff as a fashion journalist, stylist and fashion editor.

She married the photographer Jacques Curtis, a veteran of the Second World War, who joined General de Gaulle, and created the cinematographic service of Free France.

On 27 March 1961, she remarried the actor Claude Brasseur, whom she left to become the companion of Françoise Sagan in the early 1970s.

The two women remained united for fifteen years, and Peggy Roche raised the novelist's son, Denis Westhoff, who wrote in his book Sagan et Fils: "Between these two women, there was a mixture of passion, tenderness, reciprocal admiration, mutual recognition, friendship and complicity such as my mother never knew, in my memory, neither before nor after her." With Françoise Sagan's money, Peggy Roche opened a Parisian boutique and launches her own clothing line.

Through the numerous publications devoted to Françoise Sagan in Elle, Peggy Roche made the novelist “the first people writer”.

The death of Peggy Roche from cancer in September 1991 left Sagan completely distraught. “With the disappearance of Peggy, it was as if my mother had been torn to shreds, that pieces had been torn from her alive,” said Denis Westhoff. Then began a long descent into hell for the novelist, who disappears thirteen years later, diminished by her addiction to drugs and being heavily in debt.

However, Françoise Sagan, not publicly assuming her bisexuality, imposed absolute discretion on her throughout their relationship, even asking her to leave the marital home during certain visits. The two women use formal pronouns in front of the son of Françoise Sagan. Although respected and feared in the fashion world, Peggy Roche remained neglected for a long time by the general public and the novelist's biographers.

References 

1991 deaths
1929 births